Mexcala fizi is a jumping spider species in the genus Mexcala that lives in the Democratic Republic of the Congo and Tanzania. It was first described by Wanda Wesołowska in 2009.

References

Salticidae
Fauna of the Democratic Republic of the Congo
Fauna of Tanzania
Spiders of Africa
Spiders described in 2009
Taxa named by Wanda Wesołowska